Tiger Rose is a 1923 American silent romantic adventure film produced and distributed by the Warner Brothers. It is based on Willard Mack's 1917 Broadway play starring Lenore Ulric. Ulric reprises her role in this silent film version. The story was later filmed as again in 1929 as  Tiger Rose by George Fitzmaurice. The SilentEra database lists this film as surviving.

Plot
As described in a film magazine review, Trooper Michael Devlin of the Royal Northwest Mounted Police saves the life of Rose Bocion. She is an orphan, the ward of factor Hector McCollins. She falls in love with Bruce Norton. Norton slays a man who betrayed his sister and was the cause of his father's death. Aided by Dr. Cusick, who later turns out to be the husband of Norton's sister, Rose helps Norton to escape. Trooper Devlin finally arrests Norton, but he is later freed and later marries Rose.

Cast

Lenore Ulric as Rose Bocion "Tiger Rose"
Forrest Stanley as Michael Devlin
Joseph J. Dowling as Father Thibault
George Beranger as Pierre
Sam De Grasse as Dr. Cusick
Theodore von Eltz as Bruce Norton
Claude Gillingwater as Hector McCollins
Frances Starr as Undetermined Role

Box Office
According to Warner Bros records, the film earned $466,000 domestically and $39,000 in foreign markets.

References

External links

Lobby poster (Wayback)
Lobby card (archived)

1923 films
American black-and-white films
American silent feature films
Warner Bros. films
1923 adventure films
American adventure films
American films based on plays
American romance films
1920s romance films
Films directed by Sidney Franklin
1920s American films
Silent adventure films